Couchville, Tennessee was a community and U.S. Post Office founded on Stones River prior to 1880 in Davidson County, Tennessee.  Couchville was inundated when J. Percy Priest Lake was formed by impounding Stones River in the mid-1960s. The community was roughly located 500 feet to the west of the current intersection of Hobson Pike and Couchville Pike in Hermitage, Tennessee. The community's identity is preserved in the name of adjacent Couchville Cedar Glade State Natural Area.

See also
List of ghost towns in Tennessee

References

Ghost towns in Tennessee